The  is a term used to collectively describe the (usually Japanese) baseball players that belong to current Chunichi Dragons starting pitcher Daisuke Matsuzaka's age group. As per Japanese laws on how children are to be divided into grade levels, this term refers to players born between April 2, 1980, and April 1, 1981.

The term was coined by the Japanese media as the age group that came to be known as one of the deepest and most talented in Japanese professional baseball history.

Background

Precursor
In , then-Waseda Jitsugyo High School pitcher Daisuke Araki rose to national stardom for his sensational performance in the 62nd National High School Baseball Championship despite being in only his first year (Japanese equivalent of tenth grade) of high school. Araki went on to pitch in five consecutive national tournaments (spring and summer), including the National High School Baseball Invitational Tournament. His popularity, particularly among women, became such a cultural phenomenon that studies showed that Daisuke (in particular, that with the Kanji characterization "大輔") was the most popular name given to newborn infants in Japan from 1979 to 1986.

Four of the players belonging to the Matsuzaka Generation (namely, Daisuke Matsuzaka, Orix Buffaloes pitcher Daisuke Katoh and former Chunichi Dragons pitchers Daisuke Sakai and Daisuke Ue) were given this name and Kanji.

Origin
Although the year  is often associated with Matsuzaka's stellar performance as the ace pitcher for Yokohama Senior High School in the 80th National High School Baseball Championship, it was also the final year of high school for many current NPB players. Some went on to the pros immediately after high school, while others did so after playing in college or the industrial leagues.

The media coined the term "Matsuzaka Generation" to describe those born between 2 April 1980 and 1 April 1981 for a number of reasons; namely, that an exceedingly high number of players who played in the 80th National High School Baseball Tournament succeeded at the professional level; that many who went on to play at some of the highest levels of Japanese college baseball like the Tokyo Big6 and Tohto University leagues became ace pitchers for their teams as freshmen and sophomores; and that many prominent Japanese athletes as well as celebrities were born during this span as well. (It can also be said, in turn, that Matsuzaka was able to enjoy an exceptional career in the pros despite being surrounded by such a concentration of talent.) The name is thus not accredited to any particular team or organization and is said to have occurred naturally.

No single age group has produced players who have as yet collectively succeeded at the professional level to the extent to which Matsuzaka's has.

MBS Documentary
On March 3, 2003, major Japanese television network Mainichi Broadcasting System ran a special feature titled "Matsuzaka Generation – Spring, For Each of the 22-Year-Olds" (using the "ジェネレーション", the literal katakana syllabary for "Generation", instead of the Japanese word "世代", or sedai) on its popular documentary television series Jounetsu Tairiku. It covered the lives of various players who belonged to the group, some who had gone on to the pros (Nagisa Arakaki), some who still hoped to be drafted (Katsumi Higaki) and some who had decided to pursue other careers altogether (Satoshi Kamishige), nearly five years after the now-legendary 80th National High School Baseball Championship.

Criticism
The term "Matsuzaka Generation" is often used to describe players belonging to this age group more so for its sheer simplicity rather than to recognize the accomplishments of Matsuzaka himself. Despite this, players' reactions to this name being used have been mixed: the Yomiuri Giants organization is famous for rejecting the name altogether and announcing, "Please refer to the players that belong to the Matsuzaka Generation on our team as the '80's' (Eighties)." Hanshin Tigers pitcher Tomoyuki Kubota once remarked, "It makes it sound like Matsuzaka is the only one who makes this group relevant. The only thing we have in common is that we're the same age." Likewise, Fukuoka SoftBank Hawks pitcher Nagisa Arakaki has said, "Someday I'll make them call it the 'Arakaki Generation'". The Yokohama BayStars once referred to the age group as the "Koike Generation" for then-BayStars outfielder Masaaki Koike (now with the Chunichi Dragons) within the team.

"The Last Star"
While all of the players belonging to the group were naturally born within a one-year span, they entered the pros in different years depending on how many years they had spent in college, the industrial and/or the independent leagues (if at all).

There is no record of any member of this group who went pro straight after high school or spent four years in college (and was thus drafted in ) ever being referred to as "The Last Star". The first player known to have been called by this name is current Hanshin Tigers pitcher Yasutomo Kubo, who spent six years in the industrial leagues before being drafted in  despite being a well-known draft prospect since high school who once led his team to the finals of the 80th National High School Baseball Championship (losing to Yokohama Senior High).

(His situation was complicated due to an appearance in a gay porn film that caused NPB teams to blackball him and force him to play in the United States.)

Major League Baseball players
The term is typically only used in reference to Japanese players, but the Japanese media has, at times, referred to other (non-Japanese) major leaguers born during the aforementioned span as belonging to the "Matsuzaka Generation", most notably former Red Sox pitchers Josh Beckett and Jonathan Papelbon. Many other established major leagues belong to this age group, including New York Yankees pitcher C.C. Sabathia, Los Angeles Angels pitcher Dan Haren, New York Mets outfielder Curtis Granderson, Houston Astros pitcher Brett Myers, Phillies outfielder Shane Victorino, Chicago White Sox outfielder Alex Ríos, Tampa Bay Rays first/third baseman Hank Blalock, Cleveland Indians first baseman/outfielder Nick Swisher and free agent pitcher Mark Prior.

Players
There are currently 53 active players in Nippon Professional Baseball that belong to the Matsuzaka Generation (excludes foreign players acquired outside of the amateur draft). A total of 94 players belonging to this generation (including all active players) have once been on one of the twelve professional baseball teams' rosters.

Matsuzaka himself and Kazuhito Tadano played for teams in Major League Baseball.

Below is a partial list of said players. It includes only those for which English Wikipedia pages exist (as of 9 October 2010).

Nippon Professional Baseball

Central League
Hanshin Tigers
Kyuji Fujikawa - retired as of 2020
Tomoyuki Kubota - retired as of 2014
Hiroshima Toyo Carp
Hirotaka Egusa - retired as of 2017
Akihiro Higashide - retired as of 2015, currently Hiroshima batting coach
Katsuhiro Nagakawa - retired as of 2019, currently Hiroshima pitching coach
Eishin Soyogi - retired as of 2017, currently playing at industrial league
Yomiuri Giants
Ken Katoh - retired as of 2016, currently Yomiuri battery coach
Shuichi Murata - retired as of 2018, currently Yomiuri batting coach
Toshiya Sugiuchi - retired as of 2018, currently Yomiuri pitching coach
Yokohama DeNA BayStars
Taketoshi Gotoh - retired as of 2018, currently Rakuten batting coach
Yasutomo Kubo - retired as of 2017, currently playing at Atlantic League
Shuichiro Osada - retired as of 2016
Tokyo Yakult Swallows
Nagisa Arakaki - retired as of 2016
Chikara Onodera - retired as of 2012, currently Yakult pitching coach
Shohei Tateyama - retired as of 2019, currently Rakuten pitching coach
Chunichi Dragons
Yudai Kawai - retired as of 2016
Masato Kobayashi - retired as of 2014
Takahito Kudo - retired as of 2018, currently Chunichi outfield and base-running coach

Pacific League
Chiba Lotte Marines
Ryotaro Doi - retired as of 2007
Kentaro Hashimoto - retired as of 2012 
Fukuoka SoftBank Hawks
Shinsuke Ogura - retired as of 2012
Tsuyoshi Wada
Hokkaido Nippon-Ham Fighters
Hiroshi Kisanuki - retired as of 2015, currently Yomiuri pitching coach
Toshimasa Konta - retired as of 2012, currently Nippon-Ham outfield and base-running coach
Kazuhito Tadano - retired as of 2014
Kenji Yano - retired as of 2018, currently Nippon-Ham outfield and batting coach
Kazunari Sanematsu - retired as of 2019, currently Yomiuri battery coach
Orix Buffaloes
Shogo Akada - retired as of 2014, currently Seibu batting coach
Eiichi Koyano - retired as of 2018, currently Orix batting coach
Saitama Seibu Lions
Matsuzaka Daisuke
Hichori Morimoto - retired as of 2015
Naotaka Takehara - retired as of 2016
Tatsuyuki Uemoto - retired as of 2017, currently Seibu battery coach
Shogo Kimura - retired as of 2018, currently playing cricket
Tohoku Rakuten Golden Eagles
Yosuke Hiraishi - retired as of 2011, currently SoftBank batting coach
Daisuke Kato - retired as of 2013
Yuya Kubo - retired as of 2020
Jobu Morita - retired as of 2011
Toshiya Nakashima - retired as of 2014
Keiji Oyama - retired as of 2015
Naoto Watanabe - retired as of 2020
Koji Yamasaki - retired as of 2015

Other figures
Many well-known Japanese athletes as well as celebrities were also born during this aforementioned span.

Below is a partial list of such figures.

Hozumi Hasegawa (professional boxer)
Kenta Kobayashi (professional wrestler)
Daisuke Sekimoto (professional wrestler)

References

Nicknamed groups of baseball players
Baseball in Japan
Nippon Professional Baseball players